Joey Antonioli (born 15 December 2003) is a Dutch professional footballer who plays as a midfielder for FC Volendam.

Personal life
Antonioli is of Italian descent through a grandfather.

References

2003 births
Living people
People from Woerden
Dutch footballers
Dutch people of Italian descent
FC Volendam players
Tweede Divisie players
Eerste Divisie players
Association football midfielders
Footballers from Utrecht (province)